Jean "Johnny" Frederic Hugel ( September 28, 1924 - June 9, 2009) was an Alsatian wine producer, described by wine expert Tom Stevenson as "the single most important person in the development of Alsace wine industry throughout the 20th century."

Biography
Born in the village of Riquewihr, Jean Hugel began studying winemaking after World War II, attending the University of Bordeaux and University of Montpellier from the later of which he earned a Master's degree in Agronomy. In 1948 he returned to the family estate in Alsace, Hugel & Fils, where he shared in management operations with his brothers André and Georges. In 1997, Hugel scaled back on his activities in the day-to-day management of the estate as his nephews took on more prominent role. He died of cancer in 2009.

Influence on Alsatian wine industry

Jean Hugel was very active in the drafting of the Appellation d'origine contrôlée guidelines for the Alsace AOC and Alsace Grand Cru AOCs. As founder and president of the Alsace Grand Cru commission, Hugel was a major influence in defining the boundaries the Alsace Grand Cru vineyards. Hugel also developed the guidelines for the late harvest dessert wines Vendanges Tardives and Sélections de Grains Nobles. When these laws were officially recognized in 1984 they were among the strictest AOC requirements in the French wine industry.

Awards and honors
Over his more than 60 years in the Alsatian wine industry, Jean Hugel won numerous awards and honors. These include:

Membership of the Académie du Vin de France
Winner of the Catherine de Medici Prize for services to Oenology
Grand-Maître of the Confrérie Saint-Étienne d'Alsace
President of the International Wine & Spirit Competition
Awarded the Mérite Agricole for services to and successful promotion French wines
Awarded the Ordre du Mérite by the French Government for service to the French People

See also
List of wine personalities

References

External links
Jean Hugel - Daily Telegraph obituary
Official website Hugel & Fils
2005 Interview with Jean Hugel by Master of Wine Nick Clarke

1924 births
2009 deaths
People from Haut-Rhin
Wine merchants
French winemakers
Alsace wine